The Federated Auto Parts 400 is an annual NASCAR Cup Series stock car race held at the Richmond Raceway in Richmond, Virginia, being the second of two races at the track with the first one being the Toyota Owners 400 in the spring. As of 2020, the race is one of the ten races in the Cup Series playoffs, run as the second race in the Round of 16. Previously, Richmond was home to the final race before the playoffs began and had been since NASCAR implemented them for the 2004 season; after the latest round of schedule realignment that distinction now belongs to the Coke Zero Sugar 400 at Daytona International Speedway.

Starting in 1991, the race was moved from Sunday afternoon to Saturday night. It became the second night race on the NASCAR schedule, following Bristol which takes place a few weeks earlier.

From 2000 to 2009, the race was sponsored in some form by Chevrolet. For 2001 and 2002, the race sponsorship was in conjunction with Warner Bros., with Looney Tunes characters featured in several cars' paint jobs. For the 2003–2009 races, the race was known as the Chevy Rock and Roll 400, and various cars were painted to promote various rock music acts. The 2010 race saw the sponsorship move from Chevrolet to the Air National Guard, a branch of the United States Air Force. The race was sponsored by Roll Global through its Wonderful Pistachios brand, a division of Roll Global subsidiary Paramount Nuts in 2011. On May 2, 2012, Federated Auto Parts and Richmond International Raceway announced that Federated Auto Parts would become the race's sponsor starting in 2012. The 2021 race, which took place on the 20th anniversary of the September 11 attacks, was called the Federated Auto Parts 400 Salute to First Responders.

Because of its proximity to (and its occasionally being run on) Patriot Day, the Pledge of Allegiance is included as part of the opening ceremony.

Past winners

Notes
1969: Race shortened from 500 laps due to rain.
1988: Track reconfigured to 0.75 miles.
1991: Race moved to a Saturday night event.
2008: Race postponed from Saturday night to Sunday afternoon due to rain.
2012: Race started late due to rain; race finished on Sunday approximately 1:30am.
2016 and 2017: Race extended due to an overtime finish.

Track length notes
1958–1967: 0.5 mile course
1968: 0.625 mile course
1969–1987: 0.542 mile course
1988–present: 0.75 mile course

Multiple winners (drivers)

Multiple winners (teams)

Manufacturer wins

Notable moments
 2013: The race, won by Carl Edwards, was marred by a team orders scheme (referred to as Spingate) designed to manipulate the outcome of the race and Chase positions in the final ten laps after Clint Bowyer intentionally spun out to allow Brian Vickers to pit after a restart from the caution, and David Gilliland being asked to slow down to allow Joey Logano to pass so that Martin Truex Jr. and Logano could secure a spot in the Chase for the Cup. NASCAR penalized the teams involved in the scheme (Michael Waltrip Racing, Penske Racing, and Front Row Motorsports) that eliminated Truex from that year's Chase, while Jeff Gordon was given a thirteenth slot (in a usually twelve-driver battle) in the Chase as a compensation.

References

External links
 

1958 establishments in Virginia
 
NASCAR Cup Series races
Recurring sporting events established in 1958
Annual sporting events in the United States